Sloan Lake is a lake in Hubbard County, in the U.S. state of Minnesota.

Sloan Lake was named for John Sloan, an early settler.

See also
List of lakes in Minnesota

References

Lakes of Minnesota
Lakes of Hubbard County, Minnesota